Charachar (English language:Shelter of the Wings) is a 1993 Bengali drama film directed and written by Buddhadev Dasgupta based on a novel by Prafulla Roy.

Plot 
Lakha (Rajit Kapoor) comes from a family of bird catchers, but questions the value of catching birds. He, and the older Bhushan (Sadhu Meher), sell their caged birds to the local dealer. Lakha's wife, Sari (Laboni Sarkar), complains that he is not ambitious enough because he cares more for the birds than for her, and she starts meeting Natobar. Kalicharan, a city dealer, suggests they sell their birds directly to him. So Bhushan and Lakha take their next catch of birds on the train to Calcutta. Kalicharan invites them to a feast for the ceremony of the birds, with disastrous consequences.

Cast
Shankar Chakraborty   
Indrani Haldar as  Gouri 
Rajit Kapoor as Lakhinder 
Sadhu Meher as  Bhushan 
Manoj Mitra   
Laboni Sarkar as  Sari

Awards
1993 - National Film Award for Best Feature Film
1994 - Golden Bear (nominated) - 44th Berlin International Film Festival.

References

External links
 

1993 films
Bengali-language Indian films
1993 drama films
Films directed by Buddhadeb Dasgupta
Best Feature Film National Film Award winners
1990s Bengali-language films